Our Town is a 2007 South Korean film.

Plot 
A neighbourhood is terrorized by a serial killer who kills and hangs his female victims in a uniquely specific way . When struggling crime fiction novelist Kyung-ju kills his landlady, he stages it to resemble the other murders. Realizing that the crime appears to be a copycat, he sets out to find the killer with the help of his detective friend.

Cast 
 Oh Man-seok as Kyung-ju
 Lee Sun-kyun as Jae-sin
 Ryu Deok-hwan as  Hyo-yi
 Kang Yi-seok as young Hyo-yi
 Park Myung-shin as Yeo Sa-jang
 Jeong Hye-won as Kim So-yeon
 Lee Moo-saeng as Jeong Myeong-bo 
 Yeom Hye-ran as Rice cake vendor

Box office 
Our Town was released in South Korea on November 29, 2007. The film received a total of 377,591 admissions nationwide.

References

External links 
  
 
 
 
 Our Town review at Twitch Film

2007 films
2007 crime thriller films
2000s serial killer films
South Korean crime thriller films
South Korean serial killer films
Cinema Service films
2000s Korean-language films
2000s South Korean films